Krawiec is a Polish surname meaning "tailor". Males and females use the same form in modern Poland. The surname is related to Kravets, Kravec, and Kravitz.

People 
 Ed Krawiec (born 1976), American motorcycle racer
 Jan Krawiec (1919–2020), Polish-American journalist
 Joyce Krawiec (born 1945), American politician
 Ken Kravec (born 1951), American baseball player
 Kevin Krawietz (born 1992), German tennis player
 Michael Krawitz, American cannabis activist
 Richard Krawiec (born 1952), American writer

See also
 
 Kravets, a related surname

Occupational surnames
Polish-language surnames